The Ohře or, slightly less commonly in English sources, the Eger (Czech also: Oharka or Ohara, Celtic: Agara), is a 316 km river in Germany (50 km) and the Czech Republic (266 km), left tributary of the Elbe. The river's catchment area is 5,588 km2, of which 4,601 km2 is in the Czech Republic, 920 km2 in Bavaria and 67 km2 in Saxony. It is the fourth-longest river in the Czech Republic.

Several districts in Germany and the Czech Republic have formed a Euroregion initiative, Euregio Egrensis, to foster co-operation in the region.

Etymology
There is a Czech pun that the Ohře got its name from the river Teplá (meaning "warm" in Czech)—"ohřát" means "to warm up". However, the real origin, which also shows in the German name, is Celtic, from Agara (the "Salmon River").
The records show the name as Agara, Agira, Agra in the 9th century, Egire, Egra or Ogra in the 11th century and Eger in 1472.

Sources

The source of the river Eger is situated in Bavaria at the foot of the Schneeberg in the Fichtel Mountains near the town of Weißenstadt.

The inwrite on the Egerwell is:

Als der Knabe kam zur Eger:
„Eger, sprich, wo eilst du hin?“
„Zu der Elbe“, rauscht es reger,
„Zu der Elbe muß ich zieh’n!“
Als der Knabe kam zur Elbe,
war die Antwort inhaltsschwer;
Donnernd braust zurück dieselbe:
„Und ich muß ins deutsche Meer!“

The river then flows through Lake Weissenstadt and the towns of Roeslau, Marktleuthen and Hohenberg where it leaves Germany. After about 35 km, the Eger (not to be confused with the town in Hungary), as the river is called in German, crosses the border into the Czech Republic to flow through parts of Bohemia which were known until 1945 as Egerland. The river passes the towns of Cheb, (like the river), Karlovy Vary, Klášterec nad Ohří, Kadaň, Žatec, Louny, and Terezín before flowing into the river Elbe at Litoměřice. The river basin of the Ohře is part of formerly German speaking Sudetenland still having many toponyms from German.

Flow
The highest volume flow rate occurs in spring. The average volume flow rate at the mouth is 37.94 m³/s. The lower part of the river flows through areas with the lowest average precipitation in the Czech Republic (less than 500 mm).

Use
The Ohře is primarily used for irrigation and hydroelectric energy. There are two dams: Skalka (built in 1962–1964, area 378 ha) and Nechranice (built 1961–1968, area 1338 ha). The river flows through the following important towns: Cheb, Sokolov, Loket, Karlovy Vary, Ostrov nad Ohří, Klášterec nad Ohří, Kadaň, Žatec, Louny, Libochovice, Budyně nad Ohří, Terezín and Litoměřice.

Tributaries
 Plesná (Left)
 Odrava (Right)
 Libocký potok (L)
 Svatava (L)
 Rolava (L)
 Teplá (R)
 Bystřice (L)
 Liboc (R)
 Blšanka (R)
 Chomutovka (L)

References

External links

 Euregio Egrensis cooperation 

 
Fichtel Mountains
Hohenberg an der Eger
International rivers of Europe
Rivers of Bavaria
Rivers of the Karlovy Vary Region
Rivers of the Ústí nad Labem Region
Rivers of Germany